The Boone Valley Classic was a golf tournament on the Senior PGA Tour from 1996 to 2001. It was last played in Augusta, Missouri at the Boone Valley Golf Club. The event was played at stroke play except that the last event, called the Enterprise Rent-A-Car Match Play Championship, was contested at both stroke play and match play. This event featured two days of stroke play, after which the field was cut to the top 16 players. These 16 competed at match play in morning and afternoon matches the last two days of the tournament.

The purse for the 2001 tournament was US$2,000,000, with $300,000 going to the winner.

Winners
Enterprise Rent-A-Car Match Play Championship
2001 Leonard Thompson

Boone Valley Classic
2000 Larry Nelson
1999 Hale Irwin
1998 Larry Nelson
1997 Hale Irwin
1996 Gibby Gilbert

Source:

References

Former PGA Tour Champions events
Golf in Missouri
Recurring sporting events established in 1996
Recurring sporting events disestablished in 2001
1996 establishments in Missouri
2001 disestablishments in Missouri